BoyWithUke (born August 25, 2002) is a pseudonymous American alt-pop singer, musician and internet personality. He rose to popularity on the online platform TikTok with his most viral single "Toxic" (2021) and with his second most viral single "IDGAF". He has become one of the most popular faceless artists on the platform. He is currently signed to Republic Records.

Career

2020–2021: Beginnings on TikTok and Toxic 
BoyWithUke began uploading to TikTok in 2020 after being introduced to the platform by his brother. His content at first didn't garnish any momentum on the platform, until 2021, several of his videos (including Minute-Long Songs) started to perform well. 

In September 2021, BoyWithUke released his extended play Faded, which features the single "Toxic". "Toxic" went viral on TikTok and was featured in over sixty-nine thousand videos on the platform. It was streamed around half a billon times. The single reached No. 1 on the Billboard Alternative Airplay charts after being on the charts for thirty-one consecutive weeks, which was the sixth-longest rise to No. 1 in Alternative Airplay's history. "Toxic" was certified silver by the British Phonographic Industry (BPI) and platinum by the Recording Industry Association of America (RIAA).

2021–2022: Republic Records and Serotonin Dreams 
In late 2021, BoyWithUke signed a deal with record label Republic Records. In 2022, he released the single "IDGAF", featuring Blackbear, from his album Serotonin Dreams. He released his debut major-label album, Serotonin Dreams, under Republic Records. It debuted at No. 7 on the Billboard Alternative Airplay and Billboard 200 charts and features "Toxic" as its lead single. After the album's release, BoyWithUke was listed as one of the top ten Billboard Emerging Artists.

Throughout 2022, BoyWithUke opened for the indie-pop trio AJR on their OK Orchestra Tour.

, he has seven million followers on TikTok and almost two hundred thousand streams in the United States, according to MRC Data.

2023-Present: Antisocial 
BoywithUke released the Extended Play "Antisocial" on February 24 with it including three songs, notably, the EP contained the already debuted single, Rockstar, as the two other songs were teased previously on his TikTok, with these songs being "idtwcbf(friends)" and "Nosedive"

Artistry 
BoyWithUke wears an opaque face shield with two large LED lights in order to ensure his anonymity. His music is centered around the ukulele but also incorporates other instruments such as the piano. He self-composes his music on GarageBand from his iPad, a free digital audio workstation for Apple devices.

BoyWithUke's music has been described as "alternative" and "alt-pop". His famous artworks besides these include "Two Moons", "Long Drives", "Loafers" and "Sick of U" (ft. Oliver Tree). His less known songs include collab with mxmtoons "Prairies", "She Said No", "Contigo", and "Scared of The Dark" a few from Fever Dreams including "Psycho", "Out of Tune", and some songs from Melatonin dreams "Letter From my Bed", "Lovely", "Route 9". 

BoyWithUke's albums are said to follow a "Dreams Saga", with Melatonin Dreams talking heavily about depression and suicidal thoughts. Fever Dreams is said to be based apon one being less depressed and suicidal than its predecessor, but ultimately still focuses its core values on low self-esteem and general melancholic and depressed themes. Serotonin Dreams is supposedly him "waking up" and the "Magnum Opus" of the saga as overall unlike its antecedent, Serotonin Dreams is focusing on realisation and generally more positive values, whilst still having occasional referances to the values of its predecessors.

Personal life 
BoyWithUke keeps most of his personal life private. He has revealed that he lives in Boston, Massachusetts. BoyWithUke stated that he was forced into classical music from the age of four, but later dropped it. This was followed by him resuming music through writing music in high school. BoyWithUke revealed that he kept and still keeps his identity hidden because he wants people to pay attention to the music and talent and not his looks.

In many of his songs, he used the name 'Tobi' including Psycho, Out of Tune and Sick of U Album Cover. He once said that he doesn't have many voices in his head. If he had, he would choose Tobi as a good name.

Discography

Albums 
 Melatonin Dreams (22 January 2021)
 Fever Dreams (4 June 2021)
 Serotonin Dreams (6 May 2022)

EPs 
 Trouvaille (5 March 2021)
 Faded (10 September 2021)
 Antisocial (24 February 2023)

Singles 
 "Small Fry" (April 2, 2021)
 "Toxic" (October 29, 2021)
 "Long Drives" (January 21, 2022)
 "IDGAF" (March 18, 2022)
 "Sick of U" (September 30, 2022)
 "Rockstar" (February 10, 2023)
 "Understand" (April 15, 2022)

References 

Alternative pop musicians
21st-century American singers
Pseudonymous artists

2002 births
Living people